Transtillaspis parummaculatum is a species of moth of the family Tortricidae. It is found in Napo Province, Ecuador.

The wingspan is 16 mm. The ground colour of the forewings is ochreous cinnamon retained in the form of spots. The markings are dark brown. The hindwings are dark brown.

Etymology
The species name refers to the markings of the forewings and is derived from Latin parum (meaning not numerous) and maculatum (meaning spotted).

References

Moths described in 2005
Transtillaspis
Moths of South America
Taxa named by Józef Razowski